Mohammad Hossein Abareghi (born 5 January 1995) is a male Iranian sprinter. He failed a doping test for the steroid stanozolol, and was banned from the sport for four years, beginning in August 2015.

Biography
During the Asian Junior Championships on 13 June 2014, he beat his 100m record of 10.50 seconds. He also broke the senior national record in the 200 meters at 20.63. On July 25, 2015, he broke his national record in 200 m at 20.47. At the 2015 World Championships in Athletics in Beijing, China he was on the startlist of the 200 metres event but did not start.

He failed a doping test for the steroid stanozolol and was banned from the sport for four years, beginning in August 2015.

See also
 Iran at the 2015 World Championships in Athletics

References

1995 births
Living people
Place of birth missing (living people)
Iranian male sprinters
World Athletics Championships athletes for Iran
Iranian sportspeople in doping cases
People from Kerman Province
Athletes (track and field) at the 2014 Asian Games
Asian Games competitors for Iran
21st-century Iranian people
Islamic Solidarity Games competitors for Iran